Edavelly is a village in Rebbena Mandal in the Adilabad district in the state of Telangana in India.

Villages in Adilabad district